O'Donel "Butch" Levy (September 20, 1945 – March 14, 2016) was a rhythm & blues, funk and jazz guitarist from Baltimore, Maryland. He was brother of session drummer Stafford Levy.

Levy studied music at the Peabody Institute at Johns Hopkins University in Baltimore. He moved to New York City and toured with George Benson and Jimmy McGriff.

Levy released his debut album, Black Velvet, in 1971 on Groove Merchant. This was followed by a live album Concert: Friday the 13th - Cook County Jail, recorded at the Cook County Jail in Chicago in 1972. Levy performed as a member of the Jimmy McGriff quintet.

Levy's second album Breeding of Mind (Groove Merchant, 1972) crossed the genres of jazz, funk, and pop. He recorded it with Charles Covington, Chester Thompson, and Eric Ward, with arrangements by Manny Albam. His fourth album Simba (1973) was arranged by Albam, produced by Sonny Lester, and recorded with Warren Bernhardt, Cecil Bridgewater, Eddie Daniels, Jon Faddis, Steve Gadd, Tony Levin, Lew Soloff, and Bill Watrous. His fifth album Everything I Do Gonna Be Funky (1974) drew attention because of its risqué album cover.

Levy's song "Bad, Bad Simba" from the 1973 album Simba was covered by Paprika Soul in 2001.

Discography
 Black Velvet (Groove Merchant, 1971)
 Breeding of Mind (Groove Merchant, 1972)
 Dawn of a New Day (Groove Merchant, 1973)
 Simba (Groove Merchant, 1974)
 Everything I Do Gonna Be Funky (Groove Merchant, 1974)
 Windows (Groove Merchant, 1976)
 Time Has Changed (LRC, 1977)
 Through a Song (ILM, 1982)
 Asian Beat (O'Donel Levy Productions, 2004)
 In the Name of Love (Room 302, 2005)

As sideman
With Jimmy McGriff
 Black Pearl (Blue Note, 1971)
 Jimmy McGriff, Junior Parker (United Artists, 1972)
 Concert: Friday the 13th - Cook County Jail (Groove Merchant, 1973)
 Giants of the Organ Come Together (Groove Merchant, 1973) 
 Giants of the Organ in Concert (Groove Merchant, 1973)

With others
 Ethel Ennis, 10 Sides of Ethel Ennis (BASF, 1973)
 Groove Holmes, New Groove (Groove Merchant, 1974)
 Herbie Mann, See Through Spirits (Atlantic, 1985)
 Norman Connors, Passion (Capitol, 1988)
 Eldee Young, Ernie Watts, Isaac "Redd" Holt, Jeremy Monteiro, Blues for the Saxophone Club (Golden String, 1996)

References

External links 
 O'Donel Levy discography and album reviews, credits & releases at AllMusic
 O'Donel Levy discography, album releases & credits at Discogs

1945 births
2016 deaths
American jazz guitarists
American funk guitarists
20th-century American guitarists